Fight For Anarchy is an EP by Canadian indie rock band Ladyhawk, released in 2007.

Track listing 
"War" – 2:46
"If You Run" – 2:00
"Amber Jam" – 0:47
"Boy You Got Another Thing Coming" – 5:32
"Red Teeth" – 5:34
"You Ran" – 1:56

References

2007 EPs
Ladyhawk (band) albums